CKUJ-FM is a community radio station that broadcasts on the frequency of 97.3 FM in Kuujjuaq, Quebec, Canada.

Owned by Société Kuujjuamiut, it is unknown when the station was originally licensed, however, CKUJ-FM began broadcasting at 90.1 FM, until it moved to its current frequency approved in 1991.

Société Kuujjuamiut also owns and operates station VF2321, broadcasting at 98.3 FM; this station repeats CHOZ-FM of St. John's, Newfoundland and Labrador.

References

External links

Kuj
Kuj
Year of establishment missing